Porcaro is the surname of:

Joe Porcaro (1930–2020), American drummer
Porcaro brothers, American musicians and members of the rock band Toto, sons of Joe Porcaro
Jeff Porcaro (1954–1992), American drummer
Mike Porcaro (1955–2015), American bassist
Steve Porcaro (born 1957), American keyboardist